This inclusive list of opera companies in Asia, Australia, and Oceania contains opera companies with entries in the Wikipedia plus other particularly noted companies based in those regions. For opera companies from other continents, see List of opera companies.

Asia

China

Japan

Korea

Philippines

Singapore

Thailand

Sri Lanka

Australia

Oceania

New Zealand

 
Companies
Oceania-related lists
Asia-related lists
Australian music-related lists
New Zealand music-related lists
Chinese music-related lists